Fiendin' 4 tha Funk was the debut album by rap group 11/5. It was released on March 31, 1995 for Dogday Records, and featured production from The Enhancer, T.C. and Reggie Smith. Fiendin' 4 tha Funk peaked at #76 on the Billboard's Top R&B/Hip-Hop Albums.

Track listing
"Peace, Knowledge, Unity"- 1:40
"11/5 On The Inside"- 4:06
"Garcia Vegas"- 3:02
"Straight Murderism"- 3:03
"Pimp Theme"- 3:45
"Flat On Yo Ass"- 3:42
"U.D.C.W.I. Of 11/5"- 4:41 (Featuring Cold World Hustlers, U.D.I.)
"Fiendin 4 tha Funk"- 3:55
"The Way I Was Raised"- 3:27
"Billy "Studio Danksta" Jam- 0:07
"Brousin"- 4:04
"Hell Raiser"- 3:24
"Kill-A-Hoe"- 4:32 (Featuring U.D.I.)

Samples
Brousin'
"Whatever You Want" by Tony! Toni! Toné!

Flat on Yo Ass
"Sneakin' in the Back" by Tom Scott and the L.A. Express

Garcia Vegas
"The Walk" by The Time

Straight Murderism
"High Powered" by Dr. Dre

References

1995 debut albums
11/5 albums